Gary Edward Sainsbury (born 17 January 1958) is a former English cricketer. A left-arm medium pace bowler from Wanstead in Essex, Sainsbury played briefly for Essex between 1979 and 1980 following three years in the Essex Second XI. He appeared in only three matches that season, taking eight wickets. He then joined Gloucestershire where he played until 1987, taking 164 First Class and 74 List-A wickets.

Notes

References
 
 

1958 births
People from Wanstead
Essex cricketers
Gloucestershire cricketers
English cricketers
Living people